The Master of Counselling or Master of Counseling (MC, M.C., M.Coun., or M.Couns.) is a postgraduate professional degree.  The degree prepares students for professional practice as counsellors or counselling psychologists in mental health clinics, community organizations, schools, post-secondary educational institutions, employee assistance programs, and private practice.    Students typically choose a specialization, such as counselling psychology, school counselling, marital & couples counselling, career counselling, or art therapy.

Country-specific information

Australia
A number of Australian universities, including University of Notre Dame Australia, La Trobe University, The University of Queensland, Victoria University, Monash University, and Curtin University, offer a Master of Counselling degree.

Canada
The degree is awarded by a number of Canadian universities such as the University of Calgary, the University of Lethbridge, and Athabasca University. 
The degree meets academic requirements to attain registration as a Canadian Certified Counsellor (CCC) with the Canadian Counselling and Psychotherapy Association or Registered Psychologist (R.Psych) in certain Canadian provinces, including Alberta.

New Zealand
The University of Waikato offers a Master of Counselling degree.

United Kingdom
The University of Edinburgh offers a Master of Counselling (Interpersonal Dialogue) as a two-year full-time course.

United States
Idaho State University is one of the top United States institutions offering a Master of Counseling (M.Coun.) degree with a one "L" in US spelling.  Students have the option of obtaining a degree specialization in one of the following areas:  School Counseling; Clinical Mental Health Counseling; Marriage, Couple, and Family Counseling; Student Affairs Counseling; or Clinical Rehabilitation Counseling.

Arizona State University is another United States institution offering a Master of Counseling (M.C.) degree with a one "L" in US spelling, with a degree specialization in Mental Health Counseling.

References 

Master's degrees
Counseling